Merchants Bank Building may refer to:

Merchants Bank Building (Daytona Beach, Florida), also known as the Halifax Historical Museum, listed on the National Register of Historic Places (NRHP)
Merchants Bank Building (Providence, Rhode Island), NRHP-listed

See also
Merchants and Farmers Bank Building, Okolona, Mississippi, NRHP-listed
Merchants and Planters Bank (Clarendon, Arkansas), NRHP-listed